Auston Levi-Jesaiah Trusty (born August 12, 1998) is an American professional soccer player who plays as a defender for  club Birmingham City, on loan from  club Arsenal. He previously played in the USL Championship for Bethlehem Steel and in Major League Soccer for the Philadelphia Union and the Colorado Rapids, and has represented his country at under-age levels.

Early life
Born in Media, Pennsylvania, Trusty began playing soccer with Nether United Soccer Club in Wallingford. He attended and played for Penncrest High School before joining the SockerClub youth setup of the Philadelphia Union in 2011.

Club career

Bethlehem Steel
In 2016, Trusty signed an amateur United Soccer League contract with the Philadelphia Union reserve affiliate Bethlehem Steel. The contract with the Steel allowed Trusty to remain eligible to play college soccer with the North Carolina Tar Heels. He made his debut for the Steel on April 10, 2016 against New York Red Bulls II, starting in the 0–4 defeat.

Trusty would go on to play 44 games for the Bethlehem Steel within two seasons.

Philadelphia Union
On August 10, 2016, Trusty signed a homegrown player deal with the Philadelphia Union, electing not to join the Tar Heels. Despite his signing, Trusty did not make his debut for the Union until March 3, 2018 in the club's season opener against the New England Revolution. He finished his first season with the Union having played every minute of the season as the club finished sixth in the Eastern Conference. He also scored his first professional goal on September 15 against the Montreal Impact, a 1–4 defeat.

Going into the 2019 season, Trusty continued his game streak, playing in an additional seven matches before being sent off during a match against the LA Galaxy on April 13. Following his suspension, Trusty would start 15 more matches until July 2019.

Colorado Rapids
On November 20, 2019, Trusty was traded to the Colorado Rapids in exchange for up to $750,000 in allocation money, including performance-based thresholds, as well as a percentage of a future transfer. He made his debut for the club on July 17, 2020 against Sporting Kansas City in the MLS is Back Tournament, coming off the bench. Following his debut season with the Rapids, Trusty signed a new contract on December 16, keeping him with the club through the 2023 season.

Arsenal
On January 31, 2022, Trusty signed with Premier League club Arsenal, although he would stay on loan with the Colorado Rapids until July 17, 2022. He played his last game for the Rapids on July 5, returned to Arsenal, and was immediately loaned to EFL Championship (English second-tier) club Birmingham City for the 2022–23 season.

Loan at Birmingham City
Trusty made his competitive debut in English football on July 30, 2022 in his new club's opening-day 0–0 draw at Luton Town. He scored his first two goals in England in Birmingham's 3–0 win against Bristol City on October 8. His own goal caused Birmingham's elimination from the FA Cup at the hands of Blackburn Rovers, but he redeemed himself four days later with a winning goal in the seventh minute of stopppage time of the Championship match away to Swansea City. As of February 10, Trusty had played every minute of every league match throughout the season.

International career
Trusty has represented the United States at the under-17 level, playing in the 2015 FIFA U-17 World Cup in Chile. He started the opening match, against Nigeria, but was ejected near the end of the 2–0 defeat for a poor challenge on goalscorer Victor Osimhen. He missed the second group game through suspension, and was an unused substitute for the third, a 4–1 loss to Chile that confirmed the United States' elimination from the tournament. He was a member of Tab Ramos' under-20 squad for the FIFA U-20 World Cup, replacing the injured Marlon Fossey. He scored one goal during the tournament, the fifth in a 6–0 victory over New Zealand on June 1.

On December 20, 2018, Trusty, alongside then teammate Mark McKenzie, received his first call-up to the senior United States squad for their January 2019 camp.

Trusty was added to the roster for the United States' January 2022 training camp in Phoenix.

Career statistics

Club

Honors
United States U20
CONCACAF Under-20 Championship: 2017

References

External links
 Profile at Major League Soccer

1998 births
Living people
Soccer players from Pennsylvania
Sportspeople from Delaware County, Pennsylvania
People from Media, Pennsylvania
American soccer players
United States men's under-20 international soccer players
United States men's youth international soccer players
Association football defenders
Philadelphia Union II players
Philadelphia Union players
Colorado Rapids players
Arsenal F.C. players
Birmingham City F.C. players
USL Championship players
Major League Soccer players
English Football League players
Homegrown Players (MLS)
African-American soccer players
21st-century African-American sportspeople
American expatriate soccer players
American expatriate sportspeople in England
Expatriate footballers in England